Rajmonda Bulku (born 16 August 1958) is an Albanian actress and former politician of Democratic Party of Albania. She appeared in numerous films and theatres as well as Zonja nga Qyteti, Duaje emrin tënd, Të Paftuarit, Vitet e pritjes, Kthimi i Ushtrisë së vdekur and Vdekja e kalit.

Career
Bulku's first part was in the movie Dimri i fundit, but it was her second movie, The Lady from the City, that gained her a national praise. She went on to play in several other movies and is currently artistically active. 

In the 1990s she also started a career as politician and became a member of the parliament, representing the Democratic Party of Albania.

Filmography 
Kafeja e fundit - (2010)
Familjet - (2009)
Etjet e Kosovës - (2006) 
Omiros - (2005)  
Tirana, viti zero - (2001)  
Nekrologji - (1994) 
Vdekja e kalit - (1992) 
Vitet e pritjes - (1990)
Një djalë edhe një vajzë - (1990)....Mesuese Matilda
Ngjyrat e moshës - (1990) 
Kthimi i ushtrisë së vdekur - (1989)....Bashkeshortja e Kontit Dizzetta
Muri i gjallë - (1989)
Binarët - (1987) E fejuara e Kujtimit
Vrasje ne gjueti - (1987) 
Dhe vjen një ditë - (1986)....Klara
Gabimi - (1986) Mamaja e Martinit
Te paftuarit - (1985)....Diana
Duaje emrin tënd - (1984)....Jona
Kërcënimi - (1981)....Ema
Shoqja nga fshati - (1980)....Meli
Ballë për ballë - (1979)  
Emblema e dikurëshme - (1977)....Mesuesja
Nusja dhe shtetrrethimi - (1977)....Shpresa
Zonja nga qyteti - (1976)...Meli
Dimri i fundit - (1976)

References

Date of birth missing (living people)
1958 births
Living people
21st-century Albanian actresses
Albanian film actresses
Albanian stage actresses
20th-century Albanian actresses
Democratic Party of Albania politicians
21st-century Albanian politicians
21st-century Albanian women politicians
Members of the Parliament of Albania
Women members of the Parliament of Albania
People from Cërrik